Joanna Mitrosz (born 21 August 1988 in Gdynia, Poland), is a retired Polish rhythmic gymnast.

Career 

Mitrosz competed at the 2008 Summer Olympics and placed 16th at the qualifications; she did not advance into the finals. She broke into the top 12 at World and European level in 2009. She had her highest placement at the 2011 World Championships finishing 8th in the all-around.

At the 2012 Summer Olympics, she reached the final and finished in 9th place.

Mitrosz married in late 2012 and decided to complete her career in 2013.

Achievements 

First Polish gymnast to win a medal at the Grand Prix Final, a bronze in hoop.

Detailed Olympic results

Competitive highlights
Results in Individual all-around

References

External links
 
 
 

1988 births
Living people
Polish rhythmic gymnasts
Olympic gymnasts of Poland
Gymnasts at the 2008 Summer Olympics
Gymnasts at the 2012 Summer Olympics
Sportspeople from Gdynia